St. Francis High School is a public high school in St. Francis, Wisconsin serving grades 9 through 12. It is located along Lake Michigan. SFHS is the only high school in the Saint Francis School District.

Academics
Classes available to St. Francis students include: English, mathematics, social studies, science, Spanish, music, art, business, health and physical education, technology education, school-to-work, and special education.

Athletics
St. Francis High School was a member of the now defunct Braveland Conference for their inaugural school year, 1962-1963. When that conference dissolved the Mariners became charter members of the Parkland Conference, and were the only school to stay in the conference for its entire existence.  When the Parkland Conference dissolved following the 2005-2006 season, SFHS joined the  Woodland Conference, and is currently a member (of the Eastern Division). St. Francis High School's sports include: baseball, basketball, cross country, football, golf, soccer, softball, swimming, tennis, track and field, volleyball, wrestling, and cheerleading. The Mariners' cross-town rivals are the Cudahy High School Packers who are also members of the Woodland East.

WIAA state championships
1975: Boys' cross country (Class B)
1976: Boys' basketball (Class B)
1976: Boys' track and field (Class B)
2009: Girls' Dance Team (D3)

Conference championships
Membership
1962-1963: Braveland Conference
1963-2006: Parkland Conference
2006-2009: Woodland Conference (Southern Division)
2009–present: Woodland Conference (Small Division)
1967-68: Baseball
1972-73: Baseball
1976-77: Boys' basketball
1976-77: Baseball
1980-81: Football
1980-81: Girls' basketball
1996-97: Football
2002-03: Football

Football

In 1994, St. Francis football had its first conference winning season since 1985. Since then, they have had 14 winning seasons, 12 playoff appearances, two conference championships and once finished as a state runner-up. As of the end of the 2007 season, the St. Francis Mariner football team has enjoyed eight consecutive playoff appearances, including a runner-up finish in the 2004 WIAA Division 4 Championship.

Baseball
The St. Francis baseball program has been in existence since 1966 and participates in the Wisconsin Interscholastic Athletic Association
summer season. The program has accumulated three conference championships, all in the Parkland Conference: in 1968, 1973, and 1977. The program offers baseball at the freshmen, junior varsity, and varsity levels.

Boys' basketball
St. Francis High School has offered boys' varsity basketball since the 1963-1964 school year In 1976 the team won the state championship. Their first and only Parkland Conference championship was in 1977, when they finished the year at 15-5.

Girls' basketball
Due to the late onset of girls' basketball in the state of Wisconsin, St. Francis did not offer basketball to females until the 1976 season. The Mariners took their first regional championship in 1978-defeated Pewaukee 38-30. In their first and only trip to state (1981), they lost to Algoma in the Class B semi-finals by a score of 31-34. The team also won 2 more regional championships (1982 and 1983) as well as another Western Division championship in the Parkland Conference (1983).

Girls' volleyball
The Mariner volleyball program started in 1974. The team has qualified for the regional finals twice (in 1996 and 1998). St. Francis High School offers volleyball at the freshmen, junior varsity, and varsity levels.

Notable alumni
 Daryl Stuermer (1952-), Genesis guitarist

References

External links
Saint Francis High School website
Wisconsin Interscholastic Athletic Association
St. Francis Mariner Baseball
St. Francis Mariner baseball

Public high schools in Wisconsin
Schools in Milwaukee County, Wisconsin
Educational institutions established in 1962